Gely Abdel Rahman (1931 – 24 August 1990)  was one of the leading Sudanese poets of the second half of the 20th century.

Early life
Gely Abdel Rahman was born in Gez'irat Saay, or Saï (island), a small island in the Nile river in northern Sudan. Ethnically from Mahas Skoot, his father migrated to Egypt in the 1920s, where he worked in Royal Palaces as Guard or (Boaab) in Ansh'as Elramel (Elsharqeia Province). Gely came to Egypt with his mother when he was two years old. He has four sisters and three brothers.  He began writing poems when he was 7. When he was nine years old, he learned the whole book of Qur'an by heart, for which he has been awarded a Royal prize. Gely joined Al-Azhar school in Cairo, where he completed his primary and secondary education. His life in Al-Azahar constituted Gely ideas about the oppression and the social inequity, when most of Al-Azahar students at that time (1940s) came from different African countries and resided in unhealthy accommodation conditions which led in many cases to students being afflicted by tuberculosis and dying because of that. Gely had been arrested when he contributed a student demonstration when he was a student in Al-Azhar.

Career

After finishing his secondary education, Gely while studying in Dar El Uloum worked as editor in one of the Egyptian newspapers. His work as editor corresponded with Gamal Abdel Nasser taking power in Egypt on 23 July 1952. Gely's first poem was published in 1953 in the El-massry news paper . Gely works as editor in El-Gamhoria Newspaper or The Republic, and also as an editor in El-massa, an art newspaper in 1955. Gely joined The Democracy Movement For National Liberation in Egypt in 1951 and continued his activities also with the Sudanese Communist Party from that time until he died in 1990.

Gely migrated to former Soviet Union to complete his university studies in Moscow in 1964. He was granted a scholarship from African and Asian writers Union, so he joined Gorky Institute for Arts in Moscow. Gely received his master's degree in arts in 1969.

After graduation, Gely worked as an editor at Moscow News newspaper and then as a lecturer at the Oriental Institute in Moscow. This institute is a part of Soviet Academic Science society. He has received a Ph.D. in Comparative Art Theory from Oriental Institute. He published much of his poetry while he had been in Moscow and also while living in Russia he had poetry published in different languages like English, Russian, and French. In 1977 he was invited to Aden University, where he worked as a lecturer in arts and in aesthetics, was awarded a professorship and spent seven years. In 1983, Gely moved to Algeria to teach at the Language and Art Institute at Algeria University, where he stayed until afflicted by Kidney failure in February 1989. He then moved to Egypt seeking a remedy. Gely Abdel Rahman died in August 1990 in Cairo after a surgical operation for a dialysis. He had been married to a Soviet woman named Malakhat Salmanova (Milla) who recently died in Switzerland, and had two daughters, Rena and Reem.

Works
 Gsa'aid meen El-sudan,Arabic قصائد من السودان or Poems from Sudan Cairo,Egypt 1956.(poetry book)
Al-jaoo'ad we'l el-s'ef el-maksoor,Arabic الجواد والسيف المكسور or "Cavalery and Broken Sword", (poetry book),1968 and republished in 1985.
 Also Gely has published a book in political studies by the title Arabic    المعونات الاجنبية و اثرها على استقلال السودان or "The foreign Aid and its Influence On Sudan Independence", Gely wrote this book in collaboration with his friend, the poet Taj elsir el-Hussan in 1958; this book was introduced by the Sudanese communist leader Abed elkhaliq Mahjoub.
Aganai El-zahefeen by Arabic اغاني الزاحفين or the "Songs of the Marchers", poetry book in collaboration with Najeeb Saroor, Mojahid Abdelmon'em and Kam'al Am'ar.
Gely has translated from Russian to Arabic different Russian poets like Rasoul Gazamotov, Gankez Atanmov, Ayann Kanybaq and others.
Boab'at El-modan El-Safr'a, Arabic بوابات المدن الصفراء  or  "Gates of Yellow Cities", (poetry book published after Gely died in Egypt by The Egyptian General Corporation for Book .
Altayer El-magboon, Arabic الطير المغبون, not published yet.
Al-hariq w'a Ahl'am Al-balabal,Arabic الحريق واحلام البلابل or "Fire and Dreams of Nightingales", also not published yet.

References
http://www.alsudani.info/index.php?type=3&id=2147509106"
https://web.archive.org/web/20070116182422/http://www.napata.org/newsletter3.html
http://www.alsahafa.info/index.php?type=3&id=2147495479

1931 births
1990 deaths
Egyptian people of Beja descent
Egyptian people of Nubian descent
20th-century Egyptian poets
20th-century Sudanese poets
Sudanese emigrants to Egypt
Sudanese people of Beja descent
Sudanese people of Nubian descent
Academic staff of the University of Aden
Egyptian male poets
20th-century male writers
Sudanese expatriates in the Soviet Union